Riverside Cemetery in Rochester, Monroe County, New York, United States, was founded in 1892 to serve the growing population in the northern part of the city. Situated on 123 acres (498,000 m²) (0.2 square miles) of land between Lake Avenue and the Genesee River, the cemetery is the permanent resting place of over 250,000 people. Since 1942, the cemetery has been owned and operated by the City of Rochester.

Notable burials
 Giuseppe Aiello, organized crime leader
 William Joseph Beldue, inventor of the eyelash curler
 Virgil Warden Finlay, renowned illustrator of science-fiction and fantasy during the Pulp Era
 Kate Gleason, engineer and businesswoman
 Martha Matilda Harper, businesswoman, inventor
 Harold C. Mitchell, lawyer and New York State Assemblyman
 Lee Morse, jazz musician and singer from Oregon
 Allen J. Oliver, New York State Senator
 George F. Rogers, New York State Senator
 Blanche Scott, woman aviator
 Robert Wilcox, actor

Riverside's Section O is the resting place of American military veterans of the American Civil War and World War I.

References

External links

 Riverside and Mount Hope Cemeteries
 Riverside Cemetery
 Vintage Views of Riverside Cemetery
 Cemeteries of Monroe County

Geography of Rochester, New York
Cemeteries in Monroe County, New York
Tourist attractions in Rochester, New York